Shawanaga 17 is an Anishinaabe First Nations reserve in Parry Sound District, Ontario. It is one of the reserves of the Shawanaga First Nation.

References

Anishinaabe reserves in Ontario
Communities in Parry Sound District